Grand Slam is a television quiz show first created for Britain's Channel 4 in 2003. In its first and only series in the UK, the main host was Carol Vorderman. She was joined in the studio by analyst James Richardson. The off-camera "Questioner" was Nicholas Rowe.

The contestants taking part, all of them previous quiz show winners, were: Dee Voce, Geoff Owen, Olav Bjortomt, David Edwards, Mark Labbett, Clive Spate, Melanie Beaumont, Peter Lee, Gavin Fuller, David Stainer, Graham Nash, Michael Penrice, Michelle Hogan, Laura Richardson, Said Khan, and Duncan Bickley (who lost £218,000 on an episode of Who Wants to Be a Millionaire? in 2000). Each contestant paid £1000 to enter, which made up part of the prize fund (hence the title, which has a double meaning referring both to the sporting concept of a "grand slam" and to the entrance fee). The winner was Clive Spate.

Format 
The structure of the series is a single-elimination tournament, with two contestants competing in each programme. In the first round of the tournament, each heat consisted of five rounds: General Knowledge, Numbers and Logic, Contemporary Knowledge, Words and Letters and then the final round. In subsequent rounds, a Keyword round was added, with questions having a given word (the keyword) as the common theme.

In each round, each player has a minute to answer his/her questions. The players take turns to answer a question; at any time, only the clock of the person whose turn it is counts down. The question must be answered correctly in order to pass the turn, otherwise the same contestant gets another question. The round ends when one player's clock reaches zero; the other player's remaining time is carried forward to the final round.

The final round uses questions from all of the categories. Initially, both contestants are given 30 seconds. The total time accumulated from the first 3 rounds is then added to this 30 seconds to determine the amount of time on each contestants' clock. Whoever has time left at the end of the final round wins the match.

Each contestant also has three switches to use over the course of the programme, i.e. opportunities to pass the turn (and the current question) to his/her opponent. Switches can be used consecutively to pass the question back and forth between opponents.

Tournament bracket
The listed score is the number of seconds the winner had remaining at the end of the match.

US TV series 

Grand Slam was produced in the US in 2007 by Michael Davies. The initial series, premiering August 4, 2007 on GSN consists of a 16 player elimination tournament.

As with the British series, the US program is presented as a grand championship of game shows. All 16 contestants selected were noted winners on other game shows. Unlike the British series, however, the contestants did not pay an entry fee; they were instead invited for a $100,000 (US) winner-take-all tournament sponsored by Sony, which produced the show. The studio host for GSN's production is Dennis Miller. The analyst is Amanda Byram. Pat Kiernan is the Questioner. Ken Jennings was the champion for 2007. Ogi Ogas was the runner up.

External links
 UK Grand Slam Web site 
 GSN Press Release

2003 British television series debuts
2003 British television series endings
2000s British satirical television series
2000s British game shows
Channel 4 game shows
English-language television shows